Tommy Herzog (born March 25, 1977) is a Swiss bobsledder who has competed since 1999. He won a silver medal in the two-man event at the 2007 FIBT World Championships in St. Moritz.

References
Bobsleigh two-man world championship medalists since 1931
FIBT profile
Official website 

1977 births
Living people
Swiss male bobsledders
21st-century Swiss people